XHESC-FM is a radio station in Escárcega, Campeche, Mexico. Broadcasting on 103.9 FM, XHESC is owned by Núcleo Comunicación del Sureste and broadcasts La Ke Buena national grupera format.

History
XEESC-AM 820 was licensed in June 1980 for operation with 750 watts of power and migrated to FM with an authorization in 2011. Alberto Arceo Corcuera sold the station to Radio Escárcega, S.A., in 2015.

References

Regional Mexican radio stations
Radio stations in Campeche